Spitting  is the act of forcibly ejecting saliva or other substances from the mouth.  The act is often done to get rid of unwanted or foul-tasting substances in the mouth, or to get rid of a large buildup of mucus.  Spitting of small saliva droplets can also happen unintentionally during talking, especially when articulating ejective and implosive consonants.

Spitting in public is currently considered rude and a social taboo in many parts of the world including the West, while in some other parts of the world it is considered more socially acceptable.

Spitting upon another person, especially onto the face, is a global sign of anger, hatred, disrespect or contempt. It can represent a "symbolical regurgitation" or an act of intentional contamination.

In the Western world
Social attitudes towards spitting have changed greatly in Western Europe since the Middle Ages. Then, frequent spitting was part of everyday life, and at all levels of society, it was thought ill-mannered to suck back saliva to avoid spitting. By the early 1700s, spitting had become seen as something which should be concealed, and by 1859 it had progressed to being described by at least one etiquette guide as "at all times a disgusting habit." Sentiments against spitting gradually transitioned from being included in adult conduct books to so obvious as to only appear in guides for children to not be included in conduct literature even for children "because most [Western] children have the spitting ban internalized well before learning how to read."

Spittoons were used openly during the 19th century to provide an acceptable outlet for spitters. Spittoons became far less common after the influenza epidemic of 1918, and their use has since virtually disappeared, though each justice of the Supreme Court of the United States continues to be provided with a personal cuspidor.

In the first half of the 20th century the National Association for the Study and Prevention of Tuberculosis, the precursor to the American Lung Association, and state affiliates had educational campaigns against spitting to reduce the chance of spreading tuberculosis. According  to the World Health Organization coughing, sneezing, or spitting, can spread tuberculosis. The chance of catching a contagious disease by being spit on is low. 

After coffee cupping, tea tasting, and wine tasting, the sample is spit into a 'spit bucket' or spittoon.

There have been instances of spitting reported in the US, particularly from American men. In Minnesota, instances have been reported from some young people. In Canada, spitting has been reported for cities such as Ottawa and Winnipeg.

In other regions 
Spitting has been attributed to some people from Asia-Pacific countries such as Bangladesh, China, India, Indonesia, Myanmar, Papua New Guinea, Philippines, South Korea, United Arab Emirates, and Vietnam. The practice is often linked to betel chewing in many of those regions. Spitting has also been reported in some parts of Africa, such as Ghana.

Competitions
There are some places where spitting is a competitive sport, with or without a projectile in the mouth. For example, there is a Guinness World Record for cherry pit spitting and cricket spitting, and there are world championships in Kudu dung spitting.

Spitting as a protection against evil
In rural parts of North India, it was customary in olden days for mothers to lightly spit at their children (usually to the side of the children rather than directly at them) to imply a sense of disparagement and imperfection that protects them from evil eye (or nazar). Excessive admiration, even from well-meaning people, is believed to attract the evil eye, so this is believed to protect children from nazar that could be caused by their own mothers' "excessive" love of them. However, because of hygiene, transmission of disease and social taboos, this practice has waned and instead a black mark of kohl or kajal is put on the forehead or cheek of the child to ward off the evil eye. Adults use an amulet containing alum or chillies and worn on the body for this purpose. Sometimes, this is also done with brides and others by their loved ones to protect them from nazar.

Shopkeepers in the region used to sometimes make a spitting gesture on the cash proceeds from the first sale of the day (called bohni), which is a custom believed to ward-off nazar from the business.

Such a habit also existed in some Eastern European countries like Romania, and Moldova, although it is no longer widely practiced. People would gently spit in the face of younger people (often younger relatives such as grandchildren or nephews) they admire in order to avoid deochi, an involuntary curse on the individual being admired or "strangely looked upon", which is claimed to be the cause of bad fortune and sometimes malaise or various illnesses. In Greece, it is customary to "spit" three times after making a compliment to someone, the spitting is done to protect from the evil eye. This applies to all people, not just between mothers and children.

A similar-sounding expression for verbal spitting occurs in modern Hebrew as "Tfu, tfu" (here, only twice), which some say that Hebrew-speakers borrowed from Russian.

Anti-spitting hoods

When a suspect in a criminal case is arrested, they will sometimes try to spit at their captors, which often causes a fear of infection by Hepatitis C and other diseases. Spit hoods are meant to prevent this.

Gleeking 
Gleeking is the projection of saliva from the submandibular gland. It may happen deliberately or accidentally, particularly when yawning. If done deliberately, it can be regarded as a form of spitting.

In animals
 Camel
 Llama
 Spitting cobra
 Spitting spider

See also
 Drooling
 Spit-take

References

External links
 

Habits
Excretion
Saliva